Lake Youngs Park is a park in King County, Washington.  It is located just to the west of Lake Youngs.

References

Parks in King County, Washington